Happy Can Already! 3 is a Singapore dialect variety series which is telecast on Singapore's free-to-air channel, Mediacorp Channel 8. It stars Jack Neo, Mark Lee, Henry Thia, Wang Lei, Benjamin Tan and Jaspers Lai. It is broadcast every Friday from 11.30am to 12.30pm.

Cast

Liang Xi Mei Public Court

Guest performers

Development

It is produced by MediaCorp and J Team, in collaboration with local director Jack Neo and the Ministry of Communications and Information.

Music

Trivia
 On 16 November 2017, a promotional roadshow was held at Hougang Central Hub with artistes Jack Neo, Mark Lee, Marcus Chin, Henry Thia, Wang Lei, Jaspers Lai, Benjamin Tan and Liu Lingling.
 On 10 January 2018, an event was held at Ang Mo Kio with artistes Jack Neo, Mark Lee, Marcus Chin, Henry Thia, Wang Lei, Jaspers Lai and Benjamin Tan.

See also
Happy Can Already!
Happy Can Already! 2
 List of variety and infotainment programmes broadcast by MediaCorp Channel 8

References

Singaporean television series
2017 Singaporean television seasons